Deuil-la-Barre is a commune in the northern suburbs of Paris, France. It is in the Department of Val-d'Oise and the arrondissement of Sarcelles. Despite this proximity to the metropolis, Deuil has retained much of the charm of a country village, with orchards and wooded hillsides.

Name
In modern French, the word deuil means mourning. That is  not, however, the derivation of this commune's name. The word is in fact Celtic, a combination of divo (God) and ialo (a clearing in a wood.) Historical citations include the toponyms Diogilum (862,) Doguillum, Diogilo (9th century,) and Villam Dueil (1070.)

Originally called simply Deuil in modern times, the name of the commune became officially Deuil-la-Barre on 7 December 1952. Barre here has the sense of a barrier or enclosure.

The demonym is Deuillois.

History
On 7 August 1850, a part of the territory of Deuil-la-Barre (then called simply Deuil) was detached and merged with a part of the territory of Saint-Gratien, a part of the territory of Soisy-sous-Montmorency, and a part of the territory of Épinay-sur-Seine to create the commune of Enghien-les-Bains.

Population

Transport
Trains run from the Gare du Nord to Deuil-Montmagny on the quarter hour, the journey taking 14 minutes.

Cultural amenities

Municipal school of music 
The school at 2, Rue Jean Bouin is called The Cornet School after its founder Maurice Cornet. With a staff of around 30, the school offers a comprehensive education in many musical instruments and music styles. The telephone number is +33 1 39 84 03 64 and the e-mail address ecole-musique@mairie.deuillabarre.fr.

Library 
The municipal library at 38, Rue Soeur Azélie is a meeting place and a place for study, open to the general public. More than 30,000 reference sources are available. Services include loans, internet access, and photocopying. Subscription is free to children and registered students. The telephone number is +33 1 39 84 98 40 and the e-mail address bibliothèque@deuillabarre.fr.

Museum 
The town museum was established in 1984 by Michel Bourlet, a local historian. It shares premises with the school of music, both of which occupy the old keeper's lodge of the Château de La Chevrette. After refurbishment in 2012, the museum today presents a permanent exhibition organised around three central themes: religious life, land ownership, and economic/sociological development. The aim is to offer visitors a synoptic view of 2,000 years of significant events in the region's history. The telephone number is +33 1 34 28 66 12.

C2i 
C2i (Centre d'information et d'initiatives) at 35, Rue Abel Fauveau is a public space dedicated to new technologies. It is an educational resource open to the general public, offering performances, exhibitions and film screenings. Nine computer workstations are available. C2i has something to offer everyone: elementary and high school pupils, college students, seniors, the handicapped, job seekers and associations. It is divided into two multimedia labs, an audiovisual auditorium and a general meeting hall. The telephone number is +33 1 30 10 00 50 and the e-mail address c2i@deuillabarre.fr.

Festival hall 
Deuil-la-Barre has a large hall of festivities on the Rue Schaeffer, which attracts thousands of spectators every year with a notably wide spectrum of activities: concerts, theatre,  expositions, and happenings in the life of the township.

International relations

Deuil-la-Barre is twinned with:

 Nieder-Eschbach (Frankfurt), Germany (1967)  
 Vác, Hungary (1991)  
 Winsford, United Kingdom (1992)  
 Lourinhã, Portugal (2009)

See also
Communes of the Val-d'Oise department

References

External links

Official website 

Association of Mayors of the Val d'Oise 

Communes of Val-d'Oise